Neil Fox MBE (born 4 May 1939) is an English former professional rugby league footballer and player-coach who played in the 1950s, 1960s and 1970s, and coached in the 1970s and 1980s.

A left-footed goal-kicking , he set rugby league's all-time points record, scoring 6,220 points during his career. The brother of fellow rugby league players, Peter and Don Fox, Neil played for Yorkshire sides such as; Wakefield Trinity (Heritage No. 629) (two spells), Bradford Northern (Heritage No.) (two spells), Hull Kingston Rovers (Heritage No.), York, Bramley and Huddersfield.

Background
Fox was born in Sharlston, West Riding of Yorkshire, England.

He grew up supporting Huddersfield, and went on to sign for Wakefield Trinity at 16 years of age. Many believed he would follow in his elder brother Don's footsteps and sign for Featherstone Rovers.

Playing career

1950s
In 1956, Fox became the joint fifth youngest player to make his début for Wakefield Trinity, aged 16 years and 3 months. Fox was selected for Yorkshire County XIII whilst at Wakefield Trinity during the 1958–59 and 1959–60 seasons. Fox played as a left-  in Wakefield Trinity's 17–12 victory over Australia in a 1956–57 Kangaroo tour of Great Britain and France match at Belle Vue, Wakefield on Monday 10 December 1956. Fox scored 2 goals in Wakefield Trinity's 20–24 defeat by Leeds in the 1958–59 Yorkshire Cup Final at Odsal Stadium, Bradford on Saturday 18 October 1958 during the 1958–59 season. He made his international début in 1959, playing for Great Britain.

1960s
Fox played left-, i.e. number 4, and scored two tries, and 7 goals in Wakefield Trinity's 38–5 victory over Hull F.C. in the 1959–60 Challenge Cup Final at Wembley Stadium, London on 14 May 1960 in front of a crowd of 79,773. This was a new record for most points in a Challenge Cup Final. This feat was equalled by Iestyn Harris (1 try and 8 goals) in Leeds Rhinos' victory over the London Broncos in the 1999 Challenge Cup Final. The next week, Fox played as a left- in Wakefield Trinity's 3–27 defeat by Wigan in the 1959–60 Championship final at Odsal Stadium on Saturday 21 May 1960.

Fox played , and scored two tries and two goals, in the 16–10 victory over Huddersfield in the 1960–61 Yorkshire Cup Final during the 1960–61 season at Headingley Rugby Stadium, Leeds on Saturday 29 October 1960. The following year, he again played left-, i.e. number 4, and scored 5 goals, in the 19–9 victory over Leeds in the 1961–62 Yorkshire Cup Final at Odsal Stadium on Saturday 11 November 1961.

Fox won the Lance Todd Trophy as man of the match in the 1961–62 Challenge Cup Final. He scored a try and kicked 3 drop-goals in the 12–6 victory over Huddersfield at Wembley Stadium on Saturday 12 May 1962, in front of a crowd of 81,263. In 1962, Fox played in his only appearance for England.

Fox played as a left-, and scored 5 goals in the 25–10 victory over Wigan in the 1962–63 Challenge Cup Final on Saturday 11 May 1963, in front of a crowd of 84,492.

Fox played as a left- and scored 2 tries and 3 goals in the 18–2 victory over Leeds in the 1964–65 Yorkshire Cup Final at Fartown, Huddersfield on Saturday 31 October 1964.

Fox played left-, i.e. number 4, and scored 3 goals in the 21–9 victory over St. Helens in the 1966-67 Championship Final replay during the 1966–67 season at Station Road, Swinton on Wednesday 10 May 1967, scored a try and 2 goals the 17–10 victory over Hull Kingston Rovers in the Championship Final during the 1967-68 season at Headingley Rugby Stadium, Leeds on Saturday 4 May 1968. 1968 was the final year Fox played for Yorkshire, having made 17 appearances since his début in 1958.

Off the field, circa-1968, Fox owned a Turf accountant's business in Goldthorpe. He left Wakefield Trinity for the first time in 1969, joining Bradford Northern. In 1969 he played in his final international match for Great Britain.

1970s
He scored a goal in Wakefield Trinity's 11–22 defeat by Halifax in the 1971–72 Player's No.6 Trophy Final at Odsal Stadium on Saturday 22 January 1972.

Fox coached Wakefield Trinity to a 2–7 defeat by Leeds in the 1973–74 Yorkshire Cup Final at Odsal Stadium on Saturday 20 October 1973.

He played second row in Wakefield Trinity's 13–16 loss to Hull in the 1974–75 Yorkshire Cup Final at Headingley Rugby Stadium, Leeds on Saturday 26 October 1974. He was substituted during the match, despite scoring 2 goals.

For the 1974–75 season, Fox joined Hull Kingston Rovers. He won the White Rose Trophy as man of the match in Hull KR's 11–15 defeat by Leeds in the 1975–76 Yorkshire Cup on Saturday 15 November 1975. Playing at right second row, Fox scored a try and kicked two goals during the match at Odsal Stadium.

Fox then briefly joined York in 1976, before playing with Bramley in 1976–77. He then spent the 1977–78 season with Huddersfield before rejoining Bradford Northern.

Fox holds the most goals in RFL Yorkshire Cup Finals with 19, and the most points with 53 points. Fox, Alex Murphy and Mark Forster are the only British rugby league footballers to have had two Testimonial matches. Fox's were both at Wakefield Trinity, in 1966 and 1979.

He was player-coach of Huddersfield Underbank Rangers, and achieved a Holliday Cup and promotion double in 1981–82. Fox retired with the record for most points scored in Anglo-Australian test match history until overtaken by Mal Meninga in 1992.

Drop-goals (field-goals)
Neil Fox appears to have scored no drop-goals (or field-goals as they are currently known in Australasia) for Wakefield Trinity, but prior to the 1974–75 season all goals, whether; conversions, penalties, or drop-goals, scored 2-points, consequently prior to this date drop-goals were often not explicitly documented, therefore '0' drop-goals may indicate drop-goals not recorded, rather than no drop-goals scored.

Post playing
In the 1983 Birthday Honours, Fox was made a member of the Order of the British Empire (MBE) for his services to rugby league. Fox was inducted into the Rugby League Hall of Fame in 1989. On 30 August 2005 Fox, along with Billy Boston and Mick Sullivan, opened the Rugby League Heritage Centre.

In 2005 his autobiography was published by London League Publications Ltd.

On Thursday 20 August 2009, at a ceremony at Wheldon Road, the home of Castleford, Fox was named as part of the "Arriva Yorkshire Rugby League Dream Team" and had a bus named after him by Arriva Yorkshire. In 2010 he was awarded the Freedom of the City of Wakefield. The Wakefield Eastern Relief Road, opened in 2017, was named Neil Fox Way in his honour.

Sources

External links
(archived by web.archive.org) Neil Fox at rugbyleaguehistory.com
Rugby League Cup Final 1960
Wakefield Win Cup 1962
Rugby League Final 1963

1939 births
Living people
Bradford Bulls players
Bramley RLFC players
England national rugby league team players
English rugby league coaches
English rugby league players
Great Britain national rugby league team captains
Great Britain national rugby league team players
Huddersfield Giants coaches
Huddersfield Giants players
Hull Kingston Rovers players
Lance Todd Trophy winners
Members of the Order of the British Empire
People from Sharlston
Rugby league centres
Rugby league players from Wakefield
Wakefield Trinity players
Wakefield Trinity coaches
York Wasps players
Yorkshire rugby league team players